Half Serious is a 2013 Indian Bengali language film directed by Utsav Mukherjee. The film is a social satire which explores the themes of domestic violence and gender inequality.

On 26 July 2013, the producer of the proposed film Dyakh Kemon Lagey, the script of which was claimed to be registered with the Eastern India Motion Picture Association in 2011, filed a suit in a Sealdah court complaining that Mukherjee's film was a copy of his. The court immediately issued an injunction, but removed it on 31 July 2013, on the ground that no similarity was found between the  Half Serious script and the script that the complainant produced in the court.

Cast
 Roopa Ganguly
 Silajit Majumder
 Saheb Bhattacharya
 Mumtaz Sorcar
 Ridhima Ghosh
 Sudipta Chakraborty

References

Bengali-language Indian films
2010s Bengali-language films
2013 films